David Irving  was the Bishop of Saskatoon from 2010 to 2018. Ordained in 1986, he was previously Archdeacon of Kootenay.

References

Anglican bishops of Saskatoon
21st-century Anglican Church of Canada bishops
Living people
Year of birth missing (living people)